Charalambos Dionisios Aliprantis (May 12, 1946 – February 27, 2009) was a Greek-American economist and mathematician who introduced Banach space and Riesz space methods in economic theory.  He was born in Cefalonia, Greece in 1946 and immigrated to the US in 1969, where he obtained his PhD in Mathematics from Caltech in June 1973.

He was a distinguished professor of Economics and Mathematics at Purdue University.  He was the founding editor of the journals Economic Theory and Annals of Finance, an Editor of Positivity and a founding member of the Society for the Advancement of Economic Theory.

References

About Aliprantis

Books by Aliprantis

External links
 Author profile in the database zbMATH 
  

1946 births
2009 deaths
20th-century American mathematicians
21st-century American mathematicians
20th-century American economists
California Institute of Technology faculty
Functional analysts
General equilibrium theorists
20th-century Greek economists
Greek mathematicians
Indiana University–Purdue University Indianapolis faculty
Mathematical economists
Operator theorists
People from Cephalonia
Purdue University faculty